Ictidosuchops is a genus of therocephalian therapsids. There are currently two named species: Ictidosuchops intermedius and Ictidosuchops baurioides.

References

 The main groups of non-mammalian synapsids at Mikko's Phylogeny Archive

Baurioids
Therocephalia genera
Permian synapsids of Africa
Fossil taxa described in 1938
Taxa named by Robert Broom